Marvelkind is an eclectic electronic rock band from Chicago, Illinois, USA. Their music is described by rock critic Jim Derogatis as "Gonzo Electro Noise Pop" and they have been compared to bands such as Devo, The Faint, Brainiac, and Mercury Rev. Marvelkind is notable for their expansive use of keyboards and electronics coupled with extremely frenetic live shows.

The band's current lineup was formed in the early fall of 1991 in Naperville, Illinois. The original line-up of Benjamin Hughes, David Golitko, Brent Rickles, Jeremy Lemmon, and Rob Johnson, performed their first show in May, 1991, under the moniker Shangrila. After a West Coast tour in 1993, the band changed their name to Marvelkind (sometimes spelled Marvel Kind).

In the fall of 1993, Johnson departed the group, and was replaced by Aaron Miller.  In 1995, Lemmon left the band and was replaced by Seth Larson. In 1996, they began working with producer and former Mercury Rev and Shady front man David Baker and during the early winter months of 1996 they recorded the  Loofa (I Wish I Was Her)/ I'm Electro single which was never officially released.

Over the next two years, they worked with David Baker and Justin Rickles, a.k.a. J-Rick. on their debut EP Mini. Mini was released on Throwrug Records and received a fair amount of critical acclaim.
It features guest vocals from Lucky Boys Confusion guitarist/vocalist Adam Krier. 
The band toured over the next few months and officially relocated to Chicago, IL where they built a home recording studio and began working on their second release. They contributed a version of "Trouble" for the Material Issue compilation cd Just What This World Needs, as well as a Christmas single on their own Crashfinder Records. The songs have since been re-released by Volunteer Records on the Holiday Heart benefit CD.
Conquering the Universe Chorus Verse was the band's first full-length album and was released in 2001.

In January 2002 Singer, Benjamin Hughes, relocated to Los Angeles, CA. and the band went on a temporary hiatus. Members Aaron Miller, and David Golitko, went on to form Assassins. Over the next few years they managed to continue recording and released their second full-length album State of the Artificial in late 2007.

Band members 

Benjamin Hughes — Vocals, guitar
David Golitko — Vocals, guitar, keyboard
Aaron Miller —  Drums, electronics
Seth Larson — Keyboards, bass guitar

Former members
Brent Rickles — Bass Guitar (1991–2000)
Jeremy Lemmon — Guitar (1991–95)
Robert Johnson —Drums (1991–93)

Producers and Engineers
David Baker — Mini
Justin Rickles, a.k.a. J-Rick; - Mini, Two Sides 
Adam Olmsted — State of the Artificial

Discography 

Height/Lambchop           —7" single (1994)
Cherry Wine/ 94.3         —Split 7" single with Star Period Star (1997)
Purple Cassette           —Unreleased cassette demo (1997)
Mini                      —E.P. Throwrug records (1998)
Two Sides                 —Split 7" single with Today's My Super Spaceout Day(1999)
Just What This World Needs A Tribute to Material Issue —Veronica Records(2000)
A (Not So) Merry Christmas—Limited Edition CD Single (2000) 
Conquering the Universe Chorus Verse —L.P. (2001)
State of the Artificial   —L.P. (2007)

The Logan Blvd. House 
The Marvelkind lived in a house on Logan Blvd in Chicago IL, for 6 years with Mercury Rev front man David Baker. There were multiple studios setup throughout the house and guests of the marvelkind included The Faint, Soviet, Assassins, Local H, Nash Kato and a number of other local bands and artists.
Artists Seth and Lisa Williamson worked from the house garage for many years producing a number of paintings, prints, and sculptures.
The soundtrack to the feature length film Design was recorded here by David Golitko.
Early versions of the Assassins songs on their first album You Will Changed Us were recorded by Aaron Miller, David Golitko, and Joe Cassidy in the Logan house.
The house was the childhood home of Marilu Henner
Benjamin Hughes is currently working as an actor, film credits include: Just Like Heaven, Yes Man in addition to dozens of commercials.

References

External links 
https://marvelkind.bandcamp.com/
Marvelkind at Myspace
Marvelkind on CDBaby
Marvelkind at Last.fm

Indie rock musical groups from Illinois
Musical groups from Chicago